Timken 1111, also called the Timken Four Aces, was a 4-8-4 steam locomotive built in 1930 by American Locomotive Company (Alco) as a demonstration unit for new roller bearings produced by the Timken Roller Bearing Company. It was the first locomotive built with all sealed roller bearings rather than plain bearings or a combination of the two. It was later operated by the Northern Pacific Railroad as their 2626.

Timken attempted to cooperate with Northern Pacific Railroad at the end of the engine's career to preserve it and while the Northern Pacific was willing to cooperate in preserving the engine, the attempt ultimately failed and the engine was scrapped in 1958.

Design and construction 
Timken chose a 4-8-4 on which to demonstrate the company's roller bearings so the locomotive could be used in all types of railroad work, especially on heavy freight and fast passenger trains. 52 manufacturers agreed to supply parts for the locomotive "on account" until the locomotive operated over 100,000 miles (161,000 km). The suppliers' names were placed on a plaque attached to the tender for the duration of the demonstration period.

Assembly took place at Alco's Schenectady, New York plant, the former Schenectady Locomotive Works.

In-service demonstration 
The locomotive's first demonstration runs were hauling freight on the New York Central Railroad.  It was subsequently used on 13 other major railroads, including the Chesapeake and Ohio Railroad, New Haven Railroad and Pennsylvania Railroad (PRR), in both freight and passenger service. The PRR used the locomotive on a passenger train where it hauled twelve passenger cars through the Allegheny Mountains so well that the train did not require the use of helpers and arrived at its destination three minutes early.

At some of the stations on the locomotive's demonstration runs, publicity stunts were held where the locomotive was pulled by as few as three men (and in Chicago, by three women). The stunts showed that the roller bearings produced so little friction that the locomotive could easily be moved by hand.

By August 1931, the locomotive had run over 90,000 miles (145,000 km) when it was delivered to the Northern Pacific Railroad, the 15th railroad to demonstrate it. With a dynamometer car in tow, the Northern Pacific was able to drive the locomotive at sustained speeds as high as 88 mph (142 km/h) while pulling the North Coast Limited passenger train past Willow Creek, Montana. However, while in service for the Northern Pacific, 1111 suffered severe crown sheet damage. Timken demanded Northern Pacific repair it, but they refused to repair a locomotive they did not own. The resulting agreement led to the sale of 1111 to Northern Pacific.

Regular use and disposition 
The Northern Pacific purchased the 1111 from Timken on February 8, 1933, after it crossed the  mark.  The railroad renumbered it 2626, classifying it internally as locomotive class A-1 (it was the class's sole member), used it in passenger service between Seattle and Yakima, Washington, then shifted its service to passenger trains between Seattle and Missoula, Montana. They operated it for 23 years before retiring it from active service. Its last run was on August 4, 1957 when it pulled a passenger train from Seattle to Cle Elum and back.

Efforts were made to preserve the locomotive. The Timken Company even tried to purchase it and return to the company's Canton, Ohio headquarters under its own power, but it was scrapped before Timken and Northern Pacific could complete their negotiations.

References 

 1930 Timken Roller Bearing Company Engine.  Retrieved October 17, 2005.
 Nixon, Ron; Northern Pacific Locomotives: Class A-1 (2626) 4-8-4 Northern. Retrieved October 17, 2005.
 The Timken Company, The History of Timken Rail Bearings.  Retrieved October 17, 2005.

External links 
 Ron Nixon's Northern Pacific Photos.  Northern Pacific 2626, a 4-8-4 Northern Class A-1, is ready for an exhibition train at Missoula, Montana.
 SteamLocomotive.com - Northern Pacific Northerns.  Further discussion of 4-8-4 use on the Northern Pacific.

ALCO locomotives
4-8-4 locomotives
2626
Individual locomotives of the United States
Schenectady, New York
Steam locomotives of the United States
Scrapped locomotives
Unique locomotives
Standard gauge locomotives of the United States